= Guryongcheon =

River in South Korea

Guryongcheon is a river of South Korea. It is a river of the Han River system.

In 2010, the density of fish increased by 10 times compared to 2008.
